Route 26 may refer to:
 New Jersey Route S26
 County Route S26 (California)